Big Bay Water Aerodrome  is located adjacent to Big Bay, British Columbia, Canada. Big Bay lies on Stuart Island in the Discovery Islands.

References

Seaplane bases in British Columbia
Discovery Islands
Strathcona Regional District
Registered aerodromes in British Columbia